The 2017 Women's Super 3s, known for sponsorship reasons as the 2017 Toyota Super 3s, was the third Women's Super 3s competition that took place in Ireland. It ran from June to August, with 3 teams taking part made up of the best players in Ireland. The teams played 10 matches each, four 50 over matches and six Twenty20s. Scorchers won the competition, winning their second title.

Competition format
The three teams played ten matches each in a league system. Each team played the other two sides twice in a 50 over match and three times in a Twenty20 match, with all matches contributing to a unified table.

The league worked on a points system with positions being based on the total points. Points were awarded as follows:

Win: 2 points. 
Tie: 1 point. 
Loss: 0 points.
Abandoned/No Result: 1 point.

Squads

Source: Cricket Ireland

Points table

Source: CricketArchive

References

Women's Super Series
2017 in Irish cricket